Marcia Resnick (born 21 November 1950) is an American photographer, author, and graphic artist. She was born and lives in New York City.

Publications and exhibitions
Resnick's book of photographs and text, Punks, Poets, and Provocateurs:New York City Bad Boys, 1977-1982, published November 10, 2015, has an Afterword written by Anthony Haden-Guest, and a contribution by Victor Bockris. An earlier book, published in 1978 by Resnick was Re-visions, which is now out of print.

In 2016, the exhibition Marcia Resnick, Conception: Vintage Photographs 1974-1976 was shown at Deborah Bell Photographs gallery and reviewed by L'oeil de la photographie (the Eye of Photography magazine).

Photographic subjects
Her photographs of musicians of that milieu appear on their album covers. Among the subjects of her photographs are John Belushi, David Byrne, Iggy Pop, John Lydon, Mick Jagger, Andy Warhol, William Burroughs, and Allen Ginsberg.

Education, teaching, and journalism
Resnick studied at Cooper Union and New York University before going to graduate school at The California Institute of the Arts, where she studied with John Baldessari and Allen Kaprow. Back in New York, she taught at Queens College and NYU and worked for SoHo Weekly News and New York Magazine.

References

American graphic designers
1950 births
Living people
Album-cover and concert-poster artists
Women graphic designers
Punk people
Photography academics
Artists from Brooklyn
Queens College, City University of New York faculty
New York University faculty
California Institute of the Arts alumni
Cooper Union alumni
New York University alumni
20th-century American photographers
21st-century American photographers
20th-century American women photographers
21st-century American women photographers
Women in punk